En Iniye Ponnilave is a 2001 Indian Tamil-language film directed by Balu Mahendra, starring Pandiarajan and Mounika.

Cast
 Pandiarajan as Shiva
 Mounika as Rosie
Suresh Chakravarthi
 Vichithra
 Vasanth

Soundtrack
Soundtrack was composed by M. S. Viswanathan and Ilaiyaraaja.

Production
The film was initially titled Amma Appa Vilaiyaatu and was completed in the 1990s but remained unreleased. In 2001, the makers of the film re-emerged and chose to release it under a new title En Iniya Ponnilave, taken from the song from Balu Mahendra's 1981 film Moodu Pani. The film's supporting cast included Vichithra and Suresh Chakravarthy.

References

2001 films
Films directed by Balu Mahendra
Films scored by Ilaiyaraaja
2000s Tamil-language films